Aggelika Korovessi (Greek: Αγγέλικα Κοροβέση) is a Greek conceptual sculptor known for her work based on sound waves of spoken words. She lives and works in Athens, Greece.

Biography 
Her works have been exhibited widely in Greece and abroad, and are included in museum and public and private collections internationally.

Korovessi studied from 1970-1975 at the Athens School of Fine Arts under various teacher sculptors including Dimitri Kalamara. From 1985 she became specifically interested in the sound analysis of words, inspired by the work of Iannis Xenakis. Korovessi begun to create works that show the use of technology, music and science, resulting eventually in the 'sound-sculptures' which were later called SonArt.

In 2008, Korovessi was awarded the Silver Olympic Medal Award in the International “Olympic Spirit in Beijing 2008" Sculpture Competition.

From July 5 - September 1, 2013 the artist opened her exhibition at the National Archeological Museum of Athens, Greece titled Retrospective: Time, Form, Concept. This was the first contemporary art exhibition to place works amongst the museum's permanent collection.

Notable exhibitions

1994
  4th Sculpture Triennial, representing Greece, France

2001
 John F. Kennedy Center for the Performing Arts, 'Connecting Worlds', Washington, USA

2013
 National Archaeological Museum, Athens, 'Time, Form, Concept', Athens, Greece

Notable public works
 'Communication', 1988, intersection of Mesogeion Avenue and Katechaki Avenue, Athens, Greece
 'National Resistance Monument', 1997, Karakolithos, Viotia, Greece
 'Le chemin de l'eau', 2013, SIAAP plant, France

References

External links
 Aggelika Korovessi - Artist Aggelika Korovessi official website
 Aggelika Korovessi on the Saatchi Gallery website
 Aggelika Korovessi Aggelika Korovessi on the Artnews website
 SonArt Olympics SonArt link
 ΕΘΝΙΚΟ ΑΡΧΑΙΟΛΟΓΙΚΟ ΜΟΥΣΕΙΟ ΑΘΗΝΑΣ - OFFICIAL SITE National Archaeological Museum of Athens, Greece

1952 births
Living people
20th-century Greek sculptors
21st-century sculptors
20th-century Greek women artists
21st-century Greek women artists
People from Pyrgos, Elis
Greek women sculptors